Limnaecia combota is a moth in the family Cosmopterigidae. It is found in Iraq.

References

Natural History Museum Lepidoptera generic names catalog

Limnaecia
Moths described in 1921
Moths of the Middle East
Taxa named by Edward Meyrick